Melba M. Crawford is the Associate Dean of Engineering for Research and a Professor of Agronomy, Civil Engineering, and Electrical & Computer Engineering at Purdue University.  As the Nancy Uridil and Francis Bossu Professor in Civil Engineering, her specialty is Geomatics Engineering.

Crawford also serves as professor and chair of Excellence in Earth Observation.

Education
Ph.D., Ohio State University, systems engineering 1981 
MSCE, University of Illinois at Urbana–Champaign, civil engineering 1973 
BSCE, University of Illinois, civil engineering 1970,

Career
As a professor at the University of Texas, Austin, Crawford founded an "interdisciplinary research and applications development program in space-based and airborne remote sensing.”  Besides being an Associate Dean at Purdue, Crawford holds the Purdue Chair of Excellence in Earth Observation and is the Director of the Laboratory for Applications of Remote Sensing.  Crawford has worked with NASA, the US Department of State, and was the 2013–2014 President of the IEEE Geoscience and Remote Sensing Society and an Associate Editor of IEEE Transactions on Geoscience and Remote Sensing.

References

Living people
Year of birth missing (living people)
Purdue University faculty
Ohio State University College of Engineering alumni
Grainger College of Engineering alumni
University of Texas at Austin faculty
Women in optics